Hoseynabad (also Romanized as Ḩoseynābād; also known as Ḩasanābād and Ḩoseynābād-e Estakhr) is a village in Naqsh-e Rostam Rural District, in the Central District of Marvdasht County, Fars Province, Iran. At the 2006 census, its population was 703, in 155 families.

References 

Populated places in Marvdasht County